İbrahim Yılmaz (born 6 February 1994) is a Turkish professional footballer who plays as a forward for Eyüpspor in the TFF First League on loan from İstanbulspor.

Career
Yılmaz began his career with İstanbul Büyükşehir Belediyespor in 2005 and made his professional debut on 19 December 2010. He helped İstanbulspor achieve promotion in the 2021-22 season for the first time in 17 years. He started in İstanbulspor return to the Süper Lig in a in a 2–0 season opening loss to Trabzonspor on 5 August 2022.

On 12 January 2023, Yılmaz was loaned by Eyüpspor.

International career
Yılmaz represented Turkey at the 2013 UEFA U-19 Championship and 2013 FIFA U-20 World Cup.

References

External links
 
 

1994 births
Living people
Footballers from Istanbul
People from Fatih
Turkish footballers
Turkey youth international footballers
İstanbul Başakşehir F.K. players
Darıca Gençlerbirliği footballers
Şanlıurfaspor footballers
İstanbulspor footballers
Eyüpspor footballers
Süper Lig players
TFF First League players
TFF Second League players
TFF Third League players
Association football forwards